Sir Timothy James Alan Colman  (19 September 1929 – 9 September 2021) was a British businessman and a Lord Lieutenant of Norfolk.

Biography
Colman was from the Colman's mustard family, and was the son of Lettice Elizabeth Evelyn Adeane and Geoffrey Colman. Colman was educated at Heatherdown Preparatory School in Berkshire and at the age of 13 enrolled at the Royal Naval College, Dartmouth, and joined the Royal Navy. Colman later served as a second lieutenant on HMS Frobisher and Indefatigable leaving as a lieutenant in 1953, before commencing a business career. He subsequently joined the Castaways' Club. Colman was chairman of the Eastern Counties Newspaper Group from 1969 to 1996. He was appointed a Knight of the Order of the Garter in 1996.

Colman was a yachtsman, and claimed the record for the world's fastest yacht at 26.3 knots with Crossbow, a proa outrigger, at the inception of the World Sailing Speed Record Council in 1972. He increased the record to 31.2 knots three years later, and then in 1980 his catamaran Crossbow II extended the record to 36 knots. It held the record for six years until being beaten by the sailboard of Pascal Maka of France. Colman was a member of the Royal Yacht Squadron.

Colman had important roles in establishing the University of East Anglia, the creation of Whitlingham Broad and the Sainsbury Centre for Visual Arts.

Personal life
His father died in 1935, when Timothy was just six, his mother bringing up him and his four siblings - David, Juliet, Penelope and Russell.

His brother David was killed at El Alamein in 1942 aged 21, the same age that his younger brother Russell died in a railway accident in 1958.

He was married to Lady Mary Colman (née Bowes-Lyon), niece of the Queen Mother, and lived in Bixley Manor, near Norwich. Lady Mary died on 2 January 2021 and Sir Timothy died at Bixley Manor on 9 September 2021, at the age of 91. His death came one day after fellow Knight of the Garter Sir Antony Acland.

Colman's children include Sarah Troughton, who was appointed Lord Lieutenant of Wiltshire in 2012.

References

External links
Crossbow II
Speed sailing record
Big boat speed sailing

|-

1929 births
2021 deaths
English knights
English male sailors (sport)
Knights of the Garter
Knights of the Order of St John
Lord-Lieutenants of Norfolk
People associated with the University of East Anglia
People from South Norfolk (district)
People educated at Heatherdown School
Graduates of Britannia Royal Naval College
Colman family